Aquifer thermal energy storage (ATES) is the storage and recovery of thermal energy in the subsurface. ATES is applied to provide heating and cooling to buildings.
Storage and recovery of thermal energy is achieved by extraction and injection of groundwater from aquifers using groundwater wells. Systems commonly operate in a seasonal mode. The groundwater that is extracted in summer, is used for cooling by transferring heat from the building to the groundwater by means of a heat exchanger. Subsequently, the heated groundwater is injected back into the aquifer, which creates a storage of heated groundwater. In wintertime, the flow direction is reversed such that the heated groundwater is extracted and can be used for heating (often in combination with a heat pump). Therefore, operating an ATES system uses the subsurface as a temporal storage to buffer seasonal variations in heating and cooling demand. When replacing traditional fossil fuel dependent heating and cooling systems, ATES can serve as a cost-effective technology to reduce the primary energy consumption of a building and the associated  emissions.

In 2009 United Nations Climate Change Conference in Copenhagen, Denmark, many countries and regions have made targets for global climate protection. The European Union also set a target to reduce greenhouse gas emissions, increase use of sustainable energy and improve energy efficiency. For this target, ATES can actually contribute significantly, as about 40% of global energy consumption is done by buildings, and is mainly for heating and cooling. Therefore, the development of ATES has been paid a lot of attention and the number of ATES has increased dramatically, especially in Europe. For example, in the Netherlands, it was estimated that about 20,000 ATES systems could be achieved by 2020. This can yield a  emission reduction of about 11%, for the target of the Netherlands. Besides the Netherlands, Belgium, Germany, Turkey, and Sweden are also increasing the application of ATES.
ATES can be applied worldwide, as long as the climatic conditions and geohydrological conditions are right. As ATES systems cumulate in urban areas optimisation of subsurface space requires attention in areas with suitable conditions.

System types 
In its basic form, an ATES system consists of two wells (called a doublet). One well is used for heat storage, and the other for cold storage. During winter, (warm) groundwater is extracted from the heat storage well and injected in the cold storage well. During summer, the flow direction is reversed such that (cold) groundwater is extracted from the cold storage well and injected in the heat storage well. Because each well serves both as an extraction and injection well, these systems are called bi-directional. There are also mono-directional systems. These systems do not switch pumping direction, such that groundwater is always extracted at the natural aquifer temperature. Although thermal energy is stored in the subsurface, there is usually no intention to retrieve the stored energy.

Thermal energy storage can also be achieved by circulating a fluid through a buried heat exchanger, that usually consists of a horizontal or vertical pipeline. As these systems do not extract or inject groundwater, they are called closed systems and are known as borehole thermal energy storage or ground source heat pumps. Another thermal application that uses the subsurface to provide thermal energy is geothermal energy production, which commonly uses the deeper subsurface where temperature is higher.

History 
The first reported deliberate storage of thermal energy in aquifers was in China around 1960. The first ATES systems were built for industrial cooling in Shanghai. There, large amounts of groundwater were extracted to supply cooling in particular to textile factories. This led to substantial land subsidence. To inhibit the subsidence, cold surface water was injected back into the aquifer. Subsequently, it was observed that the stored water remained cold after injection and could be used for industrial cooling. Storage of thermal energy in aquifers was further suggested in the 1970s which led to field experiments and feasibility studies in France, Switzerland, US and Japan. There are no official statistics on the number and size of ATES systems worldwide.  However, worldwide there are currently more than 2800 ATES systems in operation, abstracting more than 2.5 TWh of heating and cooling per year. The Netherlands and Sweden are considered to dominate the market in terms of implementation. 85% of all systems are located in the Netherlands, and a further 10% are found in Sweden, Denmark, and Belgium. In 2012, there were approximately 104 ATES systems in Sweden with a total capacity of 110 MW. The number of ATES systems in the Netherlands in the same year was 2740, with a total estimated capacity of 1103 MW.

Typical dimensions 
Flow rates for typical applications in the utility sector are between 20 and 150 m/hour for each well. The total volume of groundwater that is stored and recovered in a year generally varies between 10 000 m and 150 000 m per well.
Depth at which ATES is applied varies commonly between 20 and 200 meters below surface. Temperature at these depths is generally close to the annual mean surface temperature. In moderate climates this is around 10 °C. In those regions cold storage is commonly applied between 5 and 10 °C and heat storage in the range 10 to 20 °C. Although less frequent, there are also some projects reported in which heat was stored above 80 °C.

Hydrogeological constrains 
Energy savings that can be achieved with ATES are strongly depending on the geology of a site. Mainly, ATES requires the presence of a suitable aquifer that is able to accept and yield water. Therefore, thick (>10 m) sandy aquifers are selected. Natural groundwater flow may transport (part of) the stored energy outside of the capture zone of a well during the storage phase. To reduce advective heat loss, aquifers with a low hydraulic gradient are preferred. In addition, gradients in geochemical composition should be avoided, as mixing of water with different geochemistry can increase clogging, which will reduce the performance of a well and lead to increased maintenance costs.

Legal status 
The legal status of shallow geothermal installations (<400 m) is diverse among countries. Regulations for installations of wells concern the use of hazardous materials and proper backfilling of the drilling hole to avoid hydraulic short circuiting between aquifers. Other legislation concerns protection of groundwater areas for drinking water supply. Some countries adopt limits for minimum and maximum storage temperatures. For example, Austria (5–20 °C), Denmark (2–25 °C) and Netherlands (5–25 °C). While other countries adopt a maximum change in groundwater temperature, for example Switzerland (3 °C) and France (11 °C).

Interference with chlorinated ethenes (CVOCs)
ATES is currently not allowed to be applied in contaminated aquifers, due to the possible spreading of contaminants in the groundwater of the subsurface, especially in urban areas. This will lead to deterioration of the quality of groundwater, which is also an important source for drinking water. Despite the regulations made to prevent the interference between ATES and groundwater contaminants, the possibility of their encounter is however rising, because of the rapid increase of the number of ATES and slow progress of remediation groundwater contaminations in urban area. Among the common groundwater contaminants, chlorinated ethenes have a most chance to interfere with the ATES system, as they are often found at the similar depth as ATES. When chlorinated ethenes present as Dense non-aqueous phase liquid (DNAPLs), the possible dissolution of DNAPLs by ATES will cause more severe impact on the groundwater quality.

Possible application in contaminated area
The possible interference between ATES and chlorinated ethenes has been also seen as an opportunity of integration of sustainable energy technology and sustainable groundwater management. The combination of ATES and enhanced bioremediation first introduced in the “More with SubSurface Energy” (Meer met Bodemenergie, MMB) project in the Netherlands in 2009. Several scientific and practical rationales are the basics for seeing such combination as a promising possibility. Increased temperature around the warm well can enhance reductive dechlorination of chlorinated ethenes. Although low temperature in cold well can hamper the biodegradation, the seasonal operation of ATES can transfer contaminant from cold well to hot well for faster biodegradation. Such seasonal groundwater transportation can also homogenize the environmental condition. ATES can be used as a biostimulation too, for example to inject electron donor or microorganism needed for reductive dechlorination. Finally, the life time of ATES (30 years) fits the long duration of in situ bioremediation.

Societal impacts 
The combination concept of ATES and enhanced natural attenuation (ATES-ENA) can possibly be used in the Netherlands and China, especially in urbanized areas. These areas in both countries are confronted with organic groundwater contaminations. Currently, the combination concept may be better applicable for the Netherlands with more mature technology and application of ATES. And the overlapping between ATES and groundwater contamination also promotes the need of this combined technology. However, for China where ATES is much less developed compared to the Netherlands, the important advantages are that many more demonstration pilot projects can be set-up prior to real applications, and flexible systems can be developed because of the less intense pressure on subsurface use by ATES compared to the Netherlands. For sustainable urban development, the combined ATES-ENA technology can provide contributions to the solution of both energy and environmental problems.

References

Aquifers
Energy storage